"Don't Call Me Baby" is a song by Anglo-American alternative pop rock band Voice of the Beehive. The song was written by lead singer Tracey Bryn with guitarist and keyboardist Mike Jones and was released as the fourth single from the band's debut album, Let It Bee (1988), on May 2, 1988. Backed with "Jump This Way" outside the US, it became a hit, peaking at  15 in the United Kingdom, No. 48 in Australia, and No. 25 in New Zealand. The song was included on the band's compilation albums A Portrait and The Best of Voice of the Beehive.

Track listings

US 7-inch single
A. "Don't Call Me Baby" – 3:05
B. "There's a Barbarian in the Back of My Car" – 2:48

International 7-inch single
A. "Don't Call Me Baby"
B. "Jump This Way"

UK and Australasian 12-inch single
A1. "Don't Call Me Baby"
B1. "Jump This Way"
B2. "Goodbye Tonight"

UK and European CD single
 "Don't Call Me Baby"
 "Jump This Way"
 "I Say Nothing"
 "Goodbye Tonight"

UK and European CD Video single
 "Don't Call Me Baby"
 "Man in the Moon"
 "Sorrow Floats"
 "Don't Call Me Baby" (video)

Credits and personnel
Credits are taken from the UK CD single liner and disc notes.
 Tracey Bryn – words
 Mike Jones – music
 Pete Collins – production
 Nigel Green – mixing
 Vivid I.D. – art direction and design
 Mike Owen – photography

Charts

References

1988 singles
1988 songs
London Records singles
Song recordings produced by Peter Collins (record producer)
Voice of the Beehive songs